is a Japanese women's professional shogi player ranked 3-dan.

Promotion history
Nakamura's promotion history is as follows.
 2-kyū: April 1, 2003
 1-kyū: April 1, 2004
 1-dan: April 1, 2005
 2-dan: February 25, 2009
 3-dan: May 4, 2015

Note: All ranks are women's professional ranks.

Titles and other championships
Nakamura has appeared in women's major title match three times, but has yet to win a major title. She was the challenger for the 17th  title in 2009, the 34th  title in 2012 and the 40th Women's Meijin title in 2013.

References

External links
 ShogiHub: Nakamura, Marika

Japanese shogi players
Living people
Women's professional shogi players
1987 births
People from Fujisawa, Kanagawa
Professional shogi players from Kanagawa Prefecture